Riskin is a surname. Notable people with the name include:

Carl Riskin, American economist
Dan Riskin, American businessman
Daniel K. Riskin, American biologist and TV personality
Everett Riskin, American film producer
Jessica Riskin, American historian of science 
Neta Riskin (born 1976), Israeli actress
Robert Riskin, American screenwriter
Shlomo Riskin, American rabbi